Ann or Anne Davis may refer to:

Ann Davis (journalist), American journalist
Ann Davis (model), American model
Ann B. Davis (1926–2014), American actress
Anne C. Davis, American mathematician
Anne Johnson Davis (died 2010), American woman who published a memoir about satanic ritual abuse
Mihi Edwards (1918–2008), New Zealand writer, social worker, teacher and kaumātua, known as Anne Davis before her marriage

See also
Anne Davies (disambiguation)